Antonio "Tony" Rocha (born 21 August 1993) is a Belizean American former professional soccer player. Born in the United States, he represented the Belize national football team.

Career

College
Rocha played college soccer at the University of Tulsa from 2011 to 2014. For the 2011 season, Rocha was named as the Conference USA Men's Soccer Freshman of the Year. He was selected to the All-Conference USA Third-Team in 2011, 2012, and 2013. In 2014, Rocha was a captain of the University of Tulsa men's soccer team and helped lead the team to a conference championship.  Rocha was named to the All-Tournament Team for the 2014 American Athletic Conference Men's Soccer Tournament.

Professional
Rocha was selected by Sporting Kansas City in the fourth round of the 2015 MLS SuperDraft. They cut him prior to the start of the season. On 9 March 2015, Rocha signed with Austin Aztex for the 2015 USL season. This would be the team's final season before dissolving and Rocha was forced to find a new club.

On 15 October 2015, Rocha became one of the first three players to sign with newly formed USL team Orlando City B along with Mikey Ambrose and Kyle Callan-McFadden.

Rocha signed a short-term agreement with Orlando City on 15 June 2016 for a 2016 U.S. Open Cup match.

On 3 August 2016, Orlando City acquired Rocha's MLS rights from Sporting Kansas City in exchange for a fourth-round pick in the 2018 MLS SuperDraft and he was signed to an MLS contract the day after.

Rocha was loaned to Saint Louis FC on 6 April 2018. He returned to Orlando a week later having played twice. At the end of the season the club announced they had not picked up his contract option.

On 12 December 2018, Rocha had his rights acquired by New York City FC in exchange for a 2019 MLS SuperDraft fourth round pick. Following the 2021 season, New York City opted to decline their contract option on Rocha.

On 18 February 2022, Rocha signed with USL Championship side Orange County SC.

International
In September 2019, Rocha was called into the Belize national football team for its CONCACAF Nations League matches against French Guiana and Grenada. He made his international debut on 8 September 2019 in Belize's 2–1 loss to Grenada.

Career statistics

Club

International

Honors
New York City FC
MLS Cup: 2021

References

External links
Tulsa Golden Hurricane bio
 

1993 births
Living people
People with acquired Belizean citizenship
Belizean footballers
Belize international footballers
American soccer players
American people of Belizean descent
Tulsa Golden Hurricane men's soccer players
Austin Aztex players
Orlando City B players
Orlando City SC players
Saint Louis FC players
New York City FC players
Orange County SC players
Association football midfielders
Soccer players from Texas
Sporting Kansas City draft picks
Sportspeople from Harris County, Texas
USL League Two players
National Premier Soccer League players
USL Championship players
Major League Soccer players
People from Spring, Texas